The 12-bar blues (or blues changes) is one of the most prominent chord progressions in popular music. The blues progression has a distinctive form in lyrics, phrase, chord structure, and duration. In its basic form, it is predominantly based on the I, IV, and V chords of a key. Mastery of the blues and rhythm changes are "critical elements for building a jazz repertoire".

Background 
The blues originated from a combination of work songs, spirituals, and early southern country music. The music was passed down through oral tradition. It was first written down by W. C. Handy, an African American composer and band leader. Its popularity led to the creation of "race records" and the popularity of blues singers like Bessie Smith and Ma Rainy. The style of music heard on race records was later called "rhythm and blues" (R & B). As the music became more popular, more people wanted to perform it. General patterns that existed in the blues were formalized, one of these being the 12-bar blues.

Basic progression
The basic progression for a 12-bar blues may be represented in several ways. 
It is shown in its simplest form, without the common "quick change", turnarounds, or seventh chords. For variations, see the following section.
Chord notation in the key of C:
{|class="wikitable" style="text-align:center; width:130px;"
|width=25%|C
|width=25%|C
|width=25%|C
|width=25%|C
|-
|width=25%|F
|width=25%|F
|width=25%|C
|width=25%|C
|-
|width=25%|G
|width=25%|G
|width=25%|C
|width=25%|C
|-
|}

Functional notationchords are represented by T to indicate the tonic, S for the subdominant, and D for the dominant:
{|class="wikitable" style="text-align:center; width:130px;"
|width=25%|T
|width=25%|T
|width=25%|T
|width=25%|T
|-
|width=25%|S
|width=25%|S
|width=25%|T
|width=25%|T
|-
|width=25%|D
|width=25%|D
|width=25%|T
|width=25%|T
|-
|}

Roman numeral notationI represents the tonic, IV the sub-dominant, and V the dominant:
{|class="wikitable" style="text-align:center; width:130px;"
|width=25%|I
|width=25%|I
|width=25%|I
|width=25%|I
|-
|width=25%|IV
|width=25%|IV
|width=25%|I
|width=25%|I
|-
|width=25%|V
|width=25%|V
|width=25%|I
|width=25%|I
|-
|}

Variations

Shuffle blues 
In the original form, the dominant chord continued through the tenth bar; later on, the V–IV–I–I "shuffle blues" pattern became standard in the third set of four bars:
{|class="wikitable" style="text-align:center; width:130px;"
|width=25%|I
|width=25%|I
|width=25%|I
|width=25%|I
|-
|width=25%|IV
|width=25%|IV
|width=25%|I
|width=25%|I
|-
|width=25%|V
|width=25%|IV
|width=25%|I
|width=25%|I
|-
|}

Quick to four 

The common quick-change, quick to four, or quick four variation uses the subdominant or IV chord in the second bar.
{|class="wikitable" style="text-align:center; width:130px;"
|width=25%|I
|width=25%|IV
|width=25%|I
|width=25%|I
|-
|width=25%|IV
|width=25%|IV
|width=25%|I
|width=25%|I
|-
|width=25%|V
|width=25%|V
|width=25%|I
|width=25%|I
|-
|}

Seventh chords 
Seventh chords are a type of chord that includes the 7th scale degree (that is, the 7th note of the scale). There are different types of 7th chords such as major 7ths, dominant 7ths, minor 7ths, half diminished 7ths, and fully diminished 7ths. These chords are similar with slight changes, but are all centered around the same key center. Dominant 7th chords are generally used throughout a blues progression. The addition of dominant 7th chords as well as the inclusion of other types of 7th chords (i.e. minor and diminished 7ths) are often used just before a change, and more changes can be added. A more complicated example might look like this, where "7" indicates a seventh chord:

{|class="wikitable" style="text-align:center; width:130px;"
|width=25%|I
|width=25%|IV
|width=25%|I
|width=25%|I7
|-
|width=25%|IV
|width=25%|IV7
|width=25%|I
|width=25%|I7
|-
|width=25%|V
|width=25%|IV
|width=25%|I
|width=25%|V7
|-
|}

Bebop blues 
This progression is similar to Charlie Parker's "Now's the Time", "Billie's Bounce", Sonny Rollins's "Tenor Madness", and many other bop tunes. Peter Spitzer describes it as "a bop soloist's cliche to arpeggiate this chord [A79 (V/ii = VI79)] from the 3 up to the 9."
{|class="wikitable" style="text-align:center; width:250px;"
|width=25%|I7
|width=25%|IV7
|width=25%|I7
|width=25%|I7
|-
|width=25%|IV7 I7
|width=25%|IV7
|width=25%|I7 
|width=25%|V/ii9
|-
|width=25%|ii7
|width=25%|V7
|width=25%|I7 V/ii9
|width=25%|ii7 V7
|-
|}

Minor blues 
There are also minor twelve-bar blues, such as John Coltrane's "Equinox" and "Mr. P.C.". The chord on the fifth scale degree may be major (V7) or minor (v7). Major and minor can also be mixed together, a signature characteristic of the music of Charles Brown.
{|class="wikitable" style="text-align:center; width:130px;"
|width=25%|i7
|width=25%|i7
|width=25%|i7
|width=25%|i7
|-
|width=25%|iv7
|width=25%|iv7
|width=25%|i7 
|width=25%|i7
|-
|width=25%|VI7
|width=25%|V7
|width=25%|i7
|width=25%|i7
|-
|}

Other variations
"W.C. Handy codified this blues form to help musicians communicate chord changes." Many variations are possible. The length of sections may be varied to create eight-bar blues or sixteen-bar blues.

Melodic line 
As the chords of a 12 bar blues follow a form, so does the melodic line. The melodic line might just be the melody of the piece or it might also include lyrics. The melody and lyrics frequently follow an AA'B form, meaning one phrase is played then repeated (perhaps with a slight alteration), then something new is played. This pattern is frequently used in the blues and in musical genres that have their roots in the blues.

See also
 Eight-bar blues
 Sixteen-bar blues
 Bird changes

References

Sources

Chord progressions
Song forms
Jazz genres
Blues music genres

Jazz terminology
12 (number)

de:Blues#Das Blues-Schema